Cognito may refer to:

Technology
 Amazon Cognito, a user identity service by Amazon Web Services (AWS)
 Cognito, an identity verification and compliance platform owned by Plaid Inc.
 Cognito, a cybersecurity platform owned by Vectra AI

People
 Ian Cognito, a British stand-up comedian
 Cognito, a hip hop documentarian who documented the making of The Ecstatic
 Cognito, a rapper formerly associated with record label Strange Music

Other uses
 Cognito, a video game label owned by Eutechnyx
 Cognito, Inc., a fictional organization in the TV series Inside Job

See also
 Livein Cognito, an album by saxophonist Tim Berne's Big Satan
 The Great Cognito, a claymation short film
 Cogito (disambiguation)
 Incognito (disambiguation)